The 11th constituency of the Hauts-de-Seine is a French legislative constituency in the Hauts-de-Seine département.

Description

Hauts-de-Seine's 11th constituency sits the south of the department bordered to the north by Paris and to the east by Val-de-Marne.

The seat has always elected left meaning deputies generally from the French Communist Party with the exceptions of the 1988 and 2012 elections. In the first round of the 2012 election Julie Sommaruga of the PS narrowly beat the incumbent communist deputy Marie-Hélène Amiable forcing her withdrawal from the second round in line with the national agreement between the two parties.

Historic Representative

Election results

2022

 
 
 
 
 
 
|-
| colspan="8" bgcolor="#E9E9E9"|
|-

2017

 
 
 
 
 
 
|-
| colspan="8" bgcolor="#E9E9E9"|
|-

2012

 
 
 
 
 
|-
| colspan="8" bgcolor="#E9E9E9"|
|-
 
 

 
 
 
 
 

* Withdrew before the 2nd round

2007

 
 
 
 
 
 
|-
| colspan="8" bgcolor="#E9E9E9"|
|-

2002

 
 
 
 
 
 
|-
| colspan="8" bgcolor="#E9E9E9"|
|-

1997

 
 
 
 
 
 
 
|-
| colspan="8" bgcolor="#E9E9E9"|
|-

Sources

 Official results of French elections from 1998: 

11